Jason Nono Mayélé (4 January 1976 – 2 March 2002) was a Congolese professional footballer who played as a forward.

Career 
Mayélé played as a striker or winger and was a member of the Chievo team that qualified for Europe in their first Serie A season which he was signed in October. He had represented his country at the African Cup of Nations. Previously he had played for Cagliari in Italy and LB Châteauroux in France.

Death 
Mayélé died in a car accident at the age of 26. His car collided with another while he was attempting to catch the Chievo team bus for a match against Parma. He was taken to hospital in Verona by helicopter, but he died of injuries sustained.

Since his death, his shirt number of 30 has been retired in his honour by Chievo.

References

External links

Statistics Up Until Start of 1999–2000 Season 

1976 births
2002 deaths
Footballers from Kinshasa
Association football wingers
Democratic Republic of the Congo footballers
Democratic Republic of the Congo expatriate footballers
LB Châteauroux players
Cagliari Calcio players
A.C. ChievoVerona players
Road incident deaths in Italy
Ligue 1 players
Ligue 2 players
Serie A players
Serie B players
Democratic Republic of the Congo international footballers
2002 African Cup of Nations players
Expatriate footballers in Italy
Expatriate footballers in France